The 2010 Central American Junior and Youth Championships in Athletics were held at the Estadio Rommel Fernández in Ciudad de Panamá, Panamá, between May 28–29, 2010. Organized by the Central American Isthmus Athletic Confederation (CADICA), it was the 23rd edition of the Junior (U-20) and the 18th edition of the Youth (U-18) competition. A total of 82 events were contested, 43 by boys and 39 by girls.

Medal summary
Complete results were published at different websites.

Junior

Boys (U-20)

Girls (U-20)

Youth

Boys (U-18)

Girls (U-18)

Medal table (unofficial)
An unofficial medal count is shown below. This medal table differs from published medal tables.  This could be explained by the fact that a couple of events might have been treated as exhibition because of the low number of participants.

Team trophies
The placing table for team trophy awarded to the 1st place overall team (boys and girls categories) was published.

Overall

Participation
A total number of 250 athletes were reported to participate in the event.

 (5)
 (68)
 (25)
 (49)
 (4)
 (19)
 Panamá (80)

References

2010
International athletics competitions hosted by Panama
2010 in athletics (track and field)
2010 in Panamanian sport
2010 in youth sport